E3 ubiquitin-protein ligase MIB2 is an enzyme that in humans is encoded by the MIB2 gene.

Interactions
MIB2 (gene) has been shown to interact with Actin, alpha 1.

References

Further reading